The Boston Barracudas were a speedway team that competed from 1970 to 1987 and again from 2000 to 2008. the team were based at Boston Sports Stadium in New Hammond Beck Road, Boston, Lincolnshire.

History

1970–1987
The Boston Barracudas were founded mid-season in 1970 by Cyril Crane when the King's Lynn Starlets changed their name. The Barracudas finished the season in 13th place.

The team continued to compete in the second division and during the 1973 British League Division Two season completed the league and cup double by finishing 1st in the league table and winning the Knockout Cup.

From 1975 to 1987 (excluding 1985) they competed in the National League (the new name for division 2). During the 1987 season the team withdrew mid-season with the last fixture being a heavy home defeat to Eastbourne on 1 August 1987, the Barracudas results were expunged.

2000–2008
In 2000 the club was reformed as Boston Barracuda-Braves, and entered the Conference League but riding at King's Lynn. During the 2000 Speedway Conference League the team finished 4th and won the Conference League Knockout Cup defeating Rye House Rockets in the final. The final silverware was winning the Conference Trophy in 2003.

The team name reverted to Boston Barracudas in 2007 but the club closed down after the 2008 season.

Season summary

Riders (previous season)

2007 team

References

Speedway Conference League teams
Sport in Boston, Lincolnshire
Defunct British speedway teams